"Love Touch" is a song performed by Rod Stewart and written by Holly Knight, Mike Chapman and Gene Black. It was released as a single in 1986 and peaked at #6 on the Billboard Hot 100. The song is played over the end credits of the Robert Redford-Debra Winger romantic comedy Legal Eagles and is often listed with the subtitle "Theme from Legal Eagles" even though it doesn't appear on the film's soundtrack album, distributed by MCA Records. The song is a plea from someone who has been fighting with his lover, but is apologizing and asking for another chance to "be good."

Reception
Cash Box called it "a delightfully perky little ditty, melodic and catchy as the day is long."  Billboard said "steel drums carry unhurried rhythms, and the rocker is temporarily tamed into a crooner."

Although it is among Stewart's most successful songs, he rarely performs "Love Touch" in concert. Stewart holds a low opinion of the song's lyrics, calling it "one of the silliest songs I've ever recorded," in the liner notes of Encore: The Very Best of Rod Stewart Volume 2.

Charts

References

Rod Stewart songs
1986 singles
1986 songs
Songs written for films
Songs written by Holly Knight
Songs written by Mike Chapman
Music videos directed by Mary Lambert